Chung Jong-Son (Korean: 정종선, born 20 March 1966) is a South Korean former international footballer who played professionally as a midfielder for POSCO Atoms, Hyundai Horang-i, Jeonbuk Hyundai Dinos and Anyang LG Cheetahs. He represented South Korea at the 1994 FIFA World Cup.

External links
 
 
 

1966 births
Living people
South Korean footballers
South Korea international footballers
Pohang Steelers players
Ulsan Hyundai FC players
Jeonbuk Hyundai Motors players
K League 1 players
FC Seoul players
1994 FIFA World Cup players
Association football midfielders